John Billington was an Englishman who travelled to the New World on the Mayflower

John Billington may also refer to:

 John Billington (executioner), (1880 – October 1905) was an English executioner
 John Billington (actor),  an English actor

See also 

 Billington (surname)
 Billinton